Lexington is an independent city in the Commonwealth of Virginia. At the 2020 census, the population was 7,320. It is the county seat of Rockbridge County, although the two are separate jurisdictions. The Bureau of Economic Analysis combines the city of Lexington (along with nearby Buena Vista) with Rockbridge County for statistical purposes. It was first settled in 1778.

Lexington is the location of the Virginia Military Institute (VMI) and of Washington and Lee University (W&L).

City Council

History
Lexington was named in 1778. It was the first of what would be many American places named after Lexington, Massachusetts, known for being the place at which the first shot was fired in the American Revolution.

The Union General David Hunter led a raid on Virginia Military Institute during the American Civil War. Robert E. Lee and Thomas "Stonewall" Jackson are buried in the city. It is the site of the only house Jackson ever owned, now open to the public as a museum. Cyrus McCormick invented the horse-drawn mechanical reaper at his family's farm in Rockbridge County, and a statue of McCormick is located on the Washington and Lee University campus. McCormick Farm is now owned by Virginia Tech and is a satellite agricultural research center.

Geography
The Maury River, a tributary of the James River, forms the city's northeastern boundary.

Climate
The climate in this area is characterized by hot, humid summers and generally mild to cool winters.  According to the Köppen climate classification system, Lexington has a humid subtropical climate, similar to Northern Italy, abbreviated "Cfa" on climate maps. Average monthly temperatures range from 34.9 °F in January to 75.2 °F in July. The hardiness zone is 7a.

Demographics

2020 census

Note: the US Census treats Hispanic/Latino as an ethnic category. This table excludes Latinos from the racial categories and assigns them to a separate category. Hispanics/Latinos can be of any race.

2000 Census
As of the census of 2000, there were 6,867 people, 2,232 households, and 1,080 families residing in the city. The population density was 2,753.8 per square mile (064.8/km2). The racial makeup was 86.01% White, 10.38% African American, 0.26% Native American, 1.92% Asian, 0.01% Pacific Islander and 0.48% from other races, and 0.93% from two or more races. Hispanic or Latino of any race were 4.1% of the population.

There were 2,232 households, of which 18.3% had children under the age of 18 living with them, 36.9% were married couples living together, 8.8% had a female householder with no husband present, and 51.6% were non-families. 41.0% of all households were made up of individuals, and 17.7% had someone living alone who was 65 years of age or older. The average household size was 2.06 and the average family size was 2.76.

In the city, the population was spread out, with 11.0% under the age of 18, 41.4% from 18 to 24, 14.5% from 25 to 44, 16.7% from 45 to 64, and 16.4% who were 65 years of age or older. The median age was 23 years. For every 100 females, there were 123.2 males. For every 100 females age 18 and over, there were 127.2 males.

The median income for a household in the city was $28,982, and the median income for a family was $58,529. Males had a median income of $35,288 versus $26,094 for females. The per capita income was $16,497. About 8.4% of families and 21.6% of the population were below the poverty line, including 12.9% of those under age 18 and 12.0% of those age 65 or over.

Economy

Today, Lexington's primary economic activities stem from higher education and tourism. With its various connections to the Civil War, Lexington attracts visitors from around the country. Places of interest in Lexington include the Stonewall Jackson House, University Chapel, the George C. Marshall Museum, Virginia Military Institute Museum, Museum of Military Memorabilia, and the downtown historic district. Hull's Drive In theater attracts visitors to the area and was the first community-owned, non-profit drive-in in the U.S.

Lexington also contains a host of small retail businesses, bed and breakfast inns, and restaurants catering to a unique mixture of local, tourist, and collegiate clientele. The historic R. E. Lee Hotel, built in the 1920s, underwent extensive renovation and re-opened its doors late 2014.

Media 
The News-Gazette is the weekly community paper; it also produces a free shopper known as The Weekender. The now-defunct The Rockbridge Weekly, noted for printing police and other local crime reports, was bought by The News-Gazette in June 2012. The Rockbridge Advocate is a monthly news magazine with the motto "Independent as a hog on ice". The Ring-tum Phi, student newspaper of W&L, has been published since 1897 (with a suspension for World War II).

Lexington is the city of license for radio stations WIQR (88.7 FM), WMRL (89.9 FM), and WLUR (91.5 FM) on W&L campus.

Transportation
Lexington is located at the intersection of historic U.S. Route 11 and U.S. Route 60 and more modern highways, Interstate 64 and Interstate 81. RADAR Transit operates the Maury Express, which provides local bus service to Lexington and Buena Vista. The Virginia Breeze provides intercity bus service between Blacksburg and Washington, D.C., with a stop in Lexington.

Motion pictures 
The 1938 movie, Brother Rat, which starred Ronald Reagan, was shot in Lexington. After the release, Reagan was made an honorary VMI cadet. The 1958 Mardi Gras starred Pat Boone as a VMI cadet appearing with actress Christine Carère. Sommersby from 1993 starred Richard Gere, Bill Pullman, James Earl Jones, and Jodie Foster. Foreign Student, released in 1994, was based on a novel of college life by former W&L student Phillipe Labro with related scenes made in town. In Fall 2004, the director Steven Spielberg and Tom Cruise filmed scenes for War of the Worlds here, with Dakota Fanning and Tim Robbins. In June 2013, filming took place for a movie titled Field of Lost Shoes about the Battle of New Market starring Luke Benward and Lauren Holly.

Filming for parts of several Civil War films also took place in Lexington, including the documentary Lee Beyond the Battles and Gods and Generals.

Controversies

Flag controversy

In 2011, the city erupted in controversy after the City Council passed an ordinance to ban the flying of flags other than the United States flag, the Virginia Flag, and an as-yet-undesigned city flag on city light poles. Various flags of the Confederacy had previously been flown on city light poles to commemorate the Virginia holiday, Lee–Jackson Day, which is observed on the Friday before Martin Luther King, Jr. Day. About 300 Confederate flag supporters, including members of the Sons of Confederate Veterans, rallied before the City Council meeting, and after the vote the Sons of Confederate Veterans vowed to challenge the new local ordinance in court. Previously, flags such as the Washington and Lee University and Virginia Military Institute flags had also been flown on city light poles, but the practice is now discontinued due to the city's ordinance.

In 2014, a large Confederate battle flag and a number of related state flags were removed from Lee Chapel at Washington and Lee University. The flags were moved to a rotating display at the Lee Chapel Museum.

Red Hen restaurant controversy
The Red Hen restaurant was the site of the June 22, 2018, precipitating event for the Red Hen restaurant controversy in which a restaurant co-owner asked White House Press Secretary Sarah Huckabee Sanders to leave the restaurant by citing Huckabee Sanders' role in the Trump administration. The incident sparked national controversy.

Points of interest 

 George C. Marshall Foundation
 Robert E. Lee grave site, found in Lee Chapel on the W&L campus.
 Traveller (Lee's horse) grave site, found along a walkway just outside Lee Chapel.
 Thomas "Stonewall" Jackson grave site, found at Oak Grove Cemetery
Stonewall Jackson House, residence of Confederate general Thomas "Stonewall" Jackson
 Sam Houston place of birth (nearby)
 Cyrus McCormick Farm, birthplace and museum (nearby)
 Kappa Alpha Order international headquarters
 Omicron Delta Kappa national headquarters
 Sigma Nu international headquarters
 Chessie Nature Trail follows the former C&O railway bed along the Maury River
 Natural Bridge (nearby)
 Hull's Drive In, the first non-profit drive-in theater in the U.S. (nearby)
 Lee Hi Travel Plaza/Berky's Restaurant, featured on Travel Channel's Truckstop Paradise (nearby)
 Gems of the Rockbridge geocaching trail
 Located near Lexington are a number of properties listed on the National Register of Historic Places, including: Anderson Hollow Archaeological District, Cedar Hill Church and Cemeteries, Chapel Hill, Church Hill, Clifton, Hamilton Schoolhouse, Liberty Hall Site, Lylburn Downing School, Maple Hall, John Moore House, Mountain View Farm, Margaret E. Poague House, Springdale, Stone House, Sunnyside, Tankersley Tavern, Thorn Hill, Timber Ridge Presbyterian Church, and Willson House.
 Lexington Carriage Company

Notable people
 William H. Armstrong, children's author and educator best known for his 1969 novel Sounder, which won the Newbery Medal.
Baroness (band), American heavy metal band whose members grew up together in Lexington.
Lena Northern Buckner, social worker
Howard Drew, competitor in the 1912 Summer Olympics.
 Kelly Evans, journalist and co-presenter for CNBC.
 Hilary Hahn, classical violinist.
 Larry Keel, bandleader and musician.
 John Letcher, 34th Governor of Virginia.
 William Lindsay, U.S. Senator from Kentucky.
 William A. MacCorkle, ninth Governor of West Virginia.
 Sally Mann, photographer.
 Gary W. Martini, posthumously awarded the Medal of Honor for his actions in the Vietnam War.
 William G. McDowell, Episcopal prelate who served as the fifth Bishop of Alabama.
 Robert Paxton, political scientist and historian.
 William N. Pendleton, Confederate general, longtime chief artilleryman for Robert E. Lee.
 John Thomas Lewis Preston, founder of Virginia Military Institute.
 Pat Robertson, founder and chairman of Christian Broadcasting Network.
 Cy Twombly, artist.
Reginald H. Ridgely Jr., United States Marine Corps lieutenant general; born in Lexington.

See also
 National Register of Historic Places listings in Lexington, Virginia

References

External links

 
 City of Lexington - Government Site
 Chamber Of Commerce
 Virginia Main Street Communities: Lexington Historic District
 Lexington During the Civil War in Encyclopedia Virginia
 Rockbridge Historical Society
 George C. Marshall Museum

 
Cities in Virginia
County seats in Virginia
Rockbridge County, Virginia
Flag controversies in the United States